Giurgeşti may refer to several villages in Romania:

 Giurgeşti, a village in Bulzeștii de Sus Commune, Hunedoara County
 Giurgeşti, a village in Costeşti Commune, Iaşi County
 Giurgeşti, a village in Vultureşti Commune, Suceava County
 Giurgeşti, a village in Tătărăni Commune, Vaslui County
 Ciceu-Giurgești, a commune in Bistriţa-Năsăud County